Gibson Creek is a  long 2nd order tributary to the Banister River in Halifax County, Virginia.

Variant names
According to the Geographic Names Information System, it has also been known historically as:
 Stewart Gibson Creek

Course 
Gibson Creek rises about 1.5 miles northwest of Scottsburg, Virginia in Halifax County and then flows south to join the Banister River about 1 mile east of Wolf Trap.

Watershed 
Gibson Creek drains  of area, receives about 45.6 in/year of precipitation, has a wetness index of 460.64, and is about 57% forested.

See also 
 List of Virginia Rivers

References 

Rivers of Halifax County, Virginia
Rivers of Virginia